Posner–Schlossman syndrome (PSS) also known as glaucomatocyclitic crisis (GCC) is a rare acute ocular condition with unilateral attacks of mild granulomatous anterior uveitis and elevated intraocular pressure. It is sometimes considered as a secondary inflammatory glaucoma.

Signs and symptoms
Ocular hypertension (IOP 30 - 70 mmHg) with open angle of anterior chamber and unilateral mild granulomatous anterior uveitis are hallmark signs of Posner–Schlossman syndrome. On slit-lamp examination, conjunctival injections, epithelial corneal edema, small to medium-sized fine keratitic precipitates, aqueous cells and flare may also be noted. Blurring of vision, eye pain and discomfort are the main symptoms. Colored halos may occur due to elevated IOP. Symptoms last from several hours to weeks and may be recurrent. IOP and aqueous humor outflow return to normal in the remission periods.

Etiology
Exact etiology of PSS is unknown. Since it was first described, A number of noninfectious etiological theories have been proposed including autonomic dysregulation, allergy, variation of developmental glaucoma, autoimmune/HLA-Bw54 and abnormality of the ciliary vasculature. Initially, infectious etiologies were not considered because of the episodic nature of the acute attacks. Recently, infectious theories associated with organisms like H. pylori, Herpes simplex virus, Varicella zoster virus, Cytomegalovirus, B. burgdorferi etc. are also emerged in medical literature.

Treatment
Main aim of treatment is to reduce IOP and decrease inflammation.

Medical
Topical steroids, such as prednisolone acetate can be used to decrease the uveal inflammation. Topical or oral non-steroidal anti-inflammatory agents may be used to avoid steroid-induced complications like secondary glaucoma. Prostaglandin analogs such as latanoprost or bimatoprost, beta-blockers such as timolol, alpha-2 agonists such as brimonidine, muscarinic agents such as pilocarpine, hyperosmotic agents such as mannitol and carbonic anhydrase inhibitors such as acetazolamide, methazolamide or dorzolamide are the drugs used to decrease IOP.

Surgical
If the elevated IOP is not responsive to medical treatment, glaucoma surgeries may be considered to prevent visual field loss.

Epidemiology
It usually affects adults between the ages of twenty and fifty and is common in males than females. One study from Finland found that the incidence of disease is 0.4 and its prevalence is 1.9 out of 100,000.

History
Posner and Schlossman first identified and described the syndrome in 1948. They  first reported a series of 9 cases and given the name glaucomatocyclitic crisis to describe this condition.

References

Syndromes affecting the eye
Glaucoma